Patrick Gerard Barnes (born 9 April 1987) is an Irish former boxer who competed as an amateur from 2005 to 2016 and as a professional from 2016 to 2019. As an amateur he competed in the light-flyweight division, representing Ireland at the 2008, 2012, and 2016 Olympics; winning bronze medals in Beijing and London, and represented Northern Ireland at the 2010 and 2014 Commonwealth Games; winning a gold medal at both events. As a professional, he challenged for the WBC flyweight title in 2018.

Early life
Barnes began boxing aged 11. He later joined the East Coast Boxing club. Barnes had an amateur record of 2-19 after his first 21 fights Aged 16, he joined Holy Family ABC in Belfast.

Amateur career

2007 | European Union Amateur Championships
In 2007, Barnes competed at the EU Championships in Dublin. He had his medal hopes crushed however when he suffered an eye injury. With bleeding found behind his retina, Barnes was forced out of the competition.

2007 | World Amateur Championships
At the World Championships in Chicago Barnes missed out on a bronze medal after he was defeated by China's Zou Shiming in the quarter finals, Zou went on to win the gold medal. 

However, Barnes qualified for the 2008 Olympics by virtue of getting to the quarter finals.
1st Round – defeated Choi Jon Chuk  North Korea 33–19
Round of 32 – defeated Sadegh Zade Faraj  Iran 30–10 (RSCO)
Round of 16 – defeated Kenji Ohkubo  Japan 24–6
Quarter final – lost to Zou Shiming  China 8–22

2008 | European Union Amateur Championships
In 2008, Barnes returned to EU Championships, this time in Cetniewo, Poland.

Barnes made it to the final where he lost to Hungarian fighter Pál Bedák. The silver medal was enough to secure his place at the Summer Olympics.

2008 | Olympic Games
Barnes won Ireland's inaugural medal, at the 2008 Summer Olympics, by winning his quarter final bout in the light flyweight division.  Barnes won a bronze medal after he was defeated in a second match with Shiming Zou in the semi-final, in a match where replays showed some of Barnes landed punches counted as points for Zou.
Round of 32 – bye
Round of 16 – defeated José Luis Meza  14–8
Quarter final – defeated Łukasz Maszczyk  11–5
Semi-final – lost to Zou Shiming  0–15

2010 | European Amateur Championships
On 12 June 2010, Barnes won the gold medal in the light flyweight division at the 2010 European Amateur Boxing Championships. Barnes, a 4–1 winner over Azerbaijan's Elvin Mamishzade, was 1–0 up at the end of the first round, 3–1 ahead at the end of the second and sealed the victory with a final point in the third for 4–1.

2010 | Commonwealth Games
Barnes represented Northern Ireland at the 2010 Commonwealth Games. He won the gold medal, defeating Namibia's Jafet Uutoni 8–4 in the final.
Round of 16 – defeated Iain Butcher  4–2
Quarter final – defeated Andrew Moloney  5–3
Semi final – defeated Amandeep Singh  5–0
Final – defeated Jafet Uutoni  8–4

2012 | Olympic Games

At the 2012 Summer Olympics he defeated Thomas Essomba from Cameroon 15–10 then beat India's Devendro Singh in his quarter-final bout to guarantee himself at least another bronze medal. In doing so, he became the inaugural Irish boxer to win medals at two consecutive Summer Olympics.

For the semi-final, Barnes once again drew Chinese superstar Zou Shiming, who had defeated Barnes in the 2008 semi-finals before taking gold. Barnes gave a fearless performance against the three time World champion, with the judges tying them 15–15 on the scorecards, only for Barnes to lose via a 45–44 countback. Shiming once again went on to win gold.
Round of 16 – defeated Thomas Essomba  15–10
Quarter final – defeated Devendro Singh  23–18
Semi-final – lost to Zou Shiming  15–15 / 44–45 (CB)

2014 | Commonwealth Games
As captain of the Northern Ireland boxing team in 2014 at Glasgow, Barnes led the way by winning gold in the flyweight division defeating India's  Devendro Singh. It was the first time a Northern Irish boxer had successfully defended a Commonwealth title.

The tournament was held at the Scottish Exhibition and Conference Centre. 17 boxers from 17 nations took part.

After the competition, Barnes accepted an honour, the MBE, in the 2015 New Year Honours, for services to boxing and the community in Northern Ireland.

2015 | World Series of Boxing
Barnes competed in the WSB for the 2014–2015 season. Along with Michael Conlan, he was drafted by Italia Thunder. His first fight came against Magomed Ibiyev of the Baku Fires, in Baku.  Barnes won with a 49–46, 49–46, 50–44 unanimous decision.

His second fight was another win, this time over Anthony Ortiz as Italia Thunder met the Puerto Rico Hurricanes. The judges scored it 48–47, 49–46, 49–46 as Barnes took another unanimous decision win.

The Hussars of Poland were next up, in Konin. Barnes continued his perfect start to the season with a landslide 50–45, 50–43, 50–45 victory over Sebastien Jagodzinski.

His record for the season went to four wins with four unanimous decisions, when he defeated Kazakh fighter Temirtas Zhussupoy of the Astana Arlans in Kazakhstan. His next fight was in Maiquetia, with a split decision win over Caciques de Venezuela's Finol Rivas. The judges scored the bout 49–45, 49–45, 47–48 in favour of Barnes.

2016 | Olympic Games
Barnes was also chosen to be the bearer of the Flag of Ireland Tricolour at the 2016 Summer Olympics, something that Barnes considered an "incredible honour". At the 2016 Summer Olympics Barnes was defeated 2–1 by Samuel Carmona in the round of 16.

Provincial and National Titles
Barnes lost the Ulster title in 2005, 2006 and 2007. He faced Jimmy Moore from Limerick in each of his national finals being runner up in 2006 but winning the All-Ireland title in 2007 and 2008.

World Series of Boxing record

Professional career

Barnes vs. Slavchev 
After his amateur success, Barnes turned professional and made his debut as a bantamweight against Stefan Slavchev on 5 November 2016. Slavchev lifted Barnes into the air during the fourth round, so Barnes won the bout via disqualification.

Barnes vs. Rosales 
On 18 August, 2018, Barnes challenged Cristofer Rosales for his WBC world flyweight title. Barnes got off to a fast start, but was introduced to Rosales' power early in the first round. In the fourth round, Rosales caught Barnes with a vicious right-hand uppercut to the solar plexus. Barnes fell on the canvas and wasn't anywhere close to beating the count, which meant a KO victory for Rosales.

Barnes vs. Harris 
On 11 October, 2019, Barnes faced Jay Harris. Barnes was dropped by his oponnent both in round three and round four. The latter proved to be the final one, as Barnes was not able to beat the count, and Harris was awarded the KO victory.

Retirement 
In November 2019, Barnes announced his retirement from professional boxing.

Professional boxing record

Marriage
Barnes and Mari Burns, parents of two daughters, wed in July 2017 at St Bernard's Roman Catholic Church, north Belfast. Barnes is also an Irish Speaker, and received a Silver Fáinne in 2019.

References

External links

 
 Irish Times interview: Barnes not pulling any punches, 24 July 2012
 Profile, marypeterstrust.org; accessed 5 January 2018.
 Paddy Barnes - Profile, News Archive & Current Rankings at Box.Live
 
 

1987 births
Living people
Boxers at the 2006 Commonwealth Games
Boxers at the 2008 Summer Olympics
Boxers at the 2010 Commonwealth Games
Boxers at the 2012 Summer Olympics
Boxers at the 2016 Summer Olympics
Male boxers from Northern Ireland
Commonwealth Games gold medallists for Northern Ireland
Light-flyweight boxers
Olympic boxers of Ireland
Olympic bronze medalists for Ireland
Olympic medalists in boxing
Boxers from Belfast
Medalists at the 2012 Summer Olympics
Medalists at the 2008 Summer Olympics
Boxers at the 2014 Commonwealth Games
Members of the Order of the British Empire
Commonwealth Games medallists in boxing
Medallists at the 2010 Commonwealth Games
Medallists at the 2014 Commonwealth Games